The Love Interest was a short-lived collaborative musical project between musicians Martin Atkins and Chris Connelly (Mary Lynn Bowling and David Wm. Sims were also featured). The group released only one recording: (1993's "Bedazzled" EP on Atkins' Invisible Records label).

"Bedazzled", is a cover of the theme from Dudley Moore and Peter Cook's 1967 film Bedazzled with words and music written by Moore.

1993 EPs
American pop music groups